Lobitos (Spanish for "Little wolves") is a populated place in San Mateo County, just east of State Route 1 and south of Half Moon Bay and the ghost town of Purissima.

Name
Lobitos means 'beads' in Spanish. It was originally named "Tunitas".

History
The Ocean Shore Railroad, which operated between San Francisco and Tunitas Creek from 1907 to 1920, passed near the village. There was apparently no station in Lobitos. Highway 1 originally passed through Lobitos; it was later rerouted to the west of the village, closely following the old railroad route.

Today, the portion of the former state highway through Lobitos has become Verde Road. The Lobitos Creek Cut-Off connects the village with Tunitas Creek Road, which runs between Highway 1 and State Route 35 (Skyline Boulevard).

References

Unincorporated communities in San Mateo County, California
Populated coastal places in California
Unincorporated communities in California